The Philippine Marine Corps (PMC) is the marine corps of the Philippines, a naval infantry force under the command of the Philippine Navy. The PMC conducts amphibious, expeditionary, and special operations missions.

History 

— LTSG Manuel Gomez's mission on the formation of the Philippine Marine Corps in 1950

On orders from President Elpidio Quirino and Ramon Magsaysay, then Secretary of National Defense, the Corps was organized on November 7, 1950, as A Company of the Philippine Fleet's 1st Marine Battalion and then headquartered in Cavite City, in Naval Base Cavite. Personnel from the United States Army and United States Marine Corps helped train the very first Philippine Marines in combat and amphibious duties in Fort Bonifacio in Makati and in various other locations. Lieutenant Senior Grade Manuel Gomez was its first commandant, with then Lieutenant Junior Grade Gregorio Lim assisting him, with six other officers (4 seconded from the Navy and two from the Philippine Army) joining them, several of these officers being veterans of the Second World War.

Their hard work and training would pay off as the Marine Company conducted its first amphibious landing on April 19, 1951, in Umiray, Quezon, and took part in battle for the first time on June 4 of the same year in Nueva Ecija against communist rebels. These and other notable battles in various parts of the country, as well as overseas deployments to Korea, led to the Navy's decision to complete the 1st Marine Battalion with the raising of B Company in 1955 and the Headquarters and Service Company also in the same year, thus the marine battalion of one HQ company and two marine rifle companies, with now LCDR Lim in charge, was finally complete. (November 7, the date of the 1955 formal raising of the 1st Marine Battalion, is the official date of the Corps Birthday to this very day.)

Further marine companies and a weapons company would later be formed to augment the expansion of the force in the 1960s, and the abilities even expanded to VIP protection, and would also see the raising of its very own drum and bugle corps. The Marines would see themselves in action in securing the Spratly Islands in 1971 and in combating Muslim separatist forces and a strong New People's Army in the following years as the force became the Philippine Marine Brigade with the formation of the 2nd and 3rd Marine Battalions, the Headquarters Service Group, the 1st Provisional Tactical Battalion which saw action in Mindanao against Islamic separatists, and the Marine Training Group, later the Philippine Marines Training Group.

To highlight these changes the force was, in 1976, renamed as the Philippine Marines.

As the 1980s arrived, the force expansion was accompanied by battles against both communists and armed Islamist rebels all over the country, and in 1986 even took part in the successful People Power Revolution. The latter years would also see them in action as one coup d'état after another was launched against the Corazon Aquino administration, all ending in failure. It also saw Rodolfo Biazon becoming the first and only Marine Corps general to head the Armed Forces as Chief of Staff after a fruitful term as Superintendent of the Philippine Military Academy, the first and only Marine Corps general officer to occupy the office so far in PMA history.

The 1990s would see further expansion as the force, as part of the Philippine Navy, became the Philippine Marine Corps in 1995 as the force turned 45 years old. The early 2000s (decade) would see the Marine Corps once more facing not just communists and Islamic militants but also terrorist groups as well.

The Marines were also seen in action in the Battle of Zamboanga City in 2013 providing amphibious assault and fire-support for the Infantry forces. During the Battle of Marawi in 2017, they were also seen fighting against the Islamic state militants as their Vehicles like LAV-300s and V-150s are modified with wooden planks to protect them against IEDs and RPGs.

On 2018,  Filipino lawmakers were proposing a law to make the Marines as an independent branch of the Armed Forces of the Philippines, but the ties with the Navy would still remain. Defense Secretary Lorenzana has opposed this proposal.

Culture 
The Philippine Marines share the traditions of both the US and Spanish marine units especially in the uniform and rank system. But the Corps has its own traditions as well.

Official traditions and customs

Core Values and Motto 
Karangalan, Katungkulan, Kabayanihan (Honor, Duty, Valor) are not just the Marine Corps motto but also the main Core Values of the Philippine Marines of today, emphasizing the kind of values that service personnel of the PMC will always live on every day.

PMC Seal 
The seal incorporates the sun with its eight rays from the Flag of the Philippines, the anchor symbolizing the naval heritage and bond of the Corps as it is a part of the Philippine Navy, the closed loop rope (different from the rope in the USMC arms) symbolizing the links of Marines to one another and to show that a Philippine Marine once will be a Philippine Marine always, and the scroll showing the Marine Corps motto and Core Values: Karangalan, Katungkulan, Kabayanihan (Honor, Duty, Valor). As with the USMC, blue represents the naval heritage while the official Marine Corps colors of scarlet and gold are also present, forming the base of Marine Corps guidons, and all three form the basis for the battle color as opposed to the latter two which is the USMC color basis.

Battle Color of the Philippine Marine Corps 
The battle color, maintained by Marine Barracks Rudiardo Brown in Fort Bonifacio, Taguig City, Metro Manila, is in navy blue with two golden scrolls, one indicating the name of the corps at the top and the other, surrounding the anchor and the sun, indicating the Marine Corps motto and core values, all in red lettering. The battle color incorporates both the anchor and the sun with eight rays from the seal, but also includes the three stars of the national flag symbolizing the Philippines's three major island groups above the anchor. The color is similar to the one used by the USMC during the First World War.

Organization

The Philippine Marine Corps is organized into four maneuver brigades, a Combat Service and Support Brigade (CSSB), the Coastal Defense Regiment (CDR) and independent units such as the Marine Special Operations Group (MARSOG) and the Marine Security and Escort Group (MSEG). The four maneuver brigades provide administrative and logistical support to the units assigned to them, while the CSSB acts as a training and administrative command for the Field Artillery (FABN) and Assault Armor (AABN) battalions.

In addition, a number of Reserve Brigades are under the control of the Naval Reserve Command.

Marine Brigades
 1st Marine Brigade
 2nd Marine Brigade
 3rd Marine Brigade
 4th Marine Brigade

Marine Rifle Battalions
The Philippine Marine Corps has twelve regular Marine Battalions. Three battalions are assigned to each of the three maneuver brigades and a single battalion is rotated back to the Marine headquarters for refit and retraining for at least six months up to one year before redeployment to operational areas in the southern Philippines.

Each of the twelve battalions is organized into three rifle companies and a headquarters and service company. The battalions are augmented with elements of other units, such as artillery, armored vehicles or watercraft, for specific tasks. These units, when supported with assets from the CSSB form the core of a Marine Battalion Landing Team (MBLT). A combat engineer unit from the Naval Combat Engineer Brigade (NCEBde) or Seabees can be attached for construction, survivability, mobility and countermobility support. Elements from the Marine Special Operations Group (MARSOG) can also be attached for reconnaissance and unconventional warfare support to make it Special Operations Capable (SOC).

Marine Reserve Units
The 7th Marine Brigade (Reserve) was activated as a provisional unit of the Philippine Navy on October 22, 1996, pursuant to Section I General Order No. 229 ONA dated October 21, 1996 during the term of Vice Admiral Pio Carranza AFP as FOIC, PN. It was assigned to the Naval Reserve Command and placed under the operational control of the Commandant, Philippine Marine Corps.
It is the Main Active Reserve Force of the Philippine Marine Corps with 3 operational Marine Battalions Composed of active men & women from different backgrounds & experiences, that are integrated to the regular & special units of the Corps. Given the same (MOS) training that enable the 7th MBde personnel to have interoperability with the rest of the Corps. Administrative control rest on the Naval Reserve Command (NRC), Philippine Navy while Operational is with the Philippine Marine Corps (MC9). Its motto is "Always Faithful, Always Ready" and nicknamed "Shadow Warriors".

Field Artillery Battalion
The Field Artillery Battalion (FABN) is currently organized into a Headquarters and Service Company and several howitzer batteries which are attached to the maneuver brigades to support their operations. It is equipped with the M101A1 howitzer, the OTO Melara Model 56/14 pack howitzer and the Soltam M71A1 155 howitzer. The unit also provides a limited air-defense capability through a token number of Bofors 40 mm L/60 guns, Oerlikon 20mm guns and M2 Browning guns, either in truck-mounted or towed configuration.

Assault Armor Battalion

The Assault Armor Battalion (AABN) contains a Headquarters and Service Company, an Armor Maintenance Company (Armor Mnt Co.), an Assault Amphibian Company (AAV Co.), and a Light Armor Vehicle Company (LAV Co.). It is tasked with providing the maneuver brigades with armored assets to support their operations. The unit's inventory consists of LAV-150s, LAV-300s, LVTP-5s and LVTH-6s, AAV7A1. None of the LVTP-5s are currently in service but the Marines have been able to recondition four of the LVTH-6s for their use.

Marine Special Operations Group

The Marine Special Operations Group, formerly the Marine Force Recon Battalion, was first activated on August 19, 1972

The Force Recon Battalion (FRBn) is organized into a Headquarters, Service and Training Company and four Recon Companies, numbered 61st, 62nd, 63rd, and 64th. Each of these companies is attached to a Marine Brigade to serve as quick maneuvering force. It specialises in sea, air and land operations, like its counterpart in the Naval Special Operations Command of the Philippine Navy, ranging from reconnaissance, close combat, demolition, intelligence and underwater operations in support to the overall naval operations.

Marine Security and Escort Group

The Marine Security and Escort Group (MSEG) is responsible for security on naval facilities, vital government installations and protection of VIPs. The unit also fills most of the PMC's ceremonial duties, and mounts the honor guard at the Rizal Monument in Rizal Park, Manila.

Marine Drum and Bugle Team
The Marine Drum and Bugle Team (MDBT) is the prime musical unit of the Philippine Marine Corps and the only Drum and Bugle Corps in the entire Armed Forces of the Philippines that provides marching band and musical services in support of the ceremonial and morale activities of the Corps. This is patterned along the lines of the United States Marine Drum and Bugle Corps and is stationed at Marine Barracks R. Brown in Makati.

Marine Scout Snipers
The Marine Scout Snipers (MSS) is the very first unit in the Armed Forces of the Philippines dedicated exclusively to sniping and marksmanship. The Scout Snipers are notable for being able to effectively hit and neutralize targets at  using only 7.62 mm rounds. The Marine Scout Snipers are renowned for the development and manufacture of their own weapon, the Colt M16A1 based Marine Scout Sniper Rifle.

Philippine Marine Corps Marine Silent Drill Platoon
Also headquartered in Makati, this is the premier military drill team of the Corps and one of 4 such units in the AFP, patterned after the United States Marine Corps Silent Drill Platoon. Like its US counterpart it does a unique silent precision exhibition drill using the M1 Garand rifles with fixed bayonets demonstrating the Corps's professionalism and discipline in all events where it is a part of.

Coastal Defense Regiment
The Coastal Defense Regiment is a newly formed unit of the Philippine Marine Corps, founded on August 7, 2020. The unit is part of the Philippine Navy's Defense Capability Program, and also serves as a part of the Philippine Navy's Active Archipelagic Defense Strategy, which aims to improve and increase sea control capabilities based on anti-access and area denial operations, while maintaining overall territorial integrity, asserting the country's sovereignty in the Exclusive Economic Zone (EEZ) and extended continental shelf, and protect Sea Lines of Communications (SLOCs). The unit also plans to acquire Shore Based Anti Ship Missile Systems, and has expressed plans to acquire the BrahMos Missile System, in order to increase the units capabilities on defending coastlines, deterring enemy littoral ships and amphibious forces, and support overall naval operations and littoral capabilities. The unit is expected to be fully functional within 2026. 
 The regiment comprises the Shore-Based Anti-Ship Missile (SBASM) Battalion and the Shore-Based Air Defense System (SBADS) Battalion which were both activated in June 2022.

Marine Bases
Marine Barracks Rudiardo Brown (Marine Base Manila), Fort Bonifacio, Taguig City.
Marine Barracks Gregorio Lim (Marine Base Ternate), Ternate, Cavite
Marine Barracks Arturo Asuncion (Marine Base Zamboanga), Zamboanga City
Marine Barracks Domingo Deluana (Marine Base Tawi-Tawi), Tawi-Tawi
Camp Gen. Teodulfo Bautista, Jolo, Sulu

In November 2021, the Philippine Marines breaks ground for the construction of its new headquarters inside the Bataan Technology Park complex in Morong, Bataan.

The BRP Sierra Madre
The Sierra Madre BRP is a Philippine Navy vessel that was intentionally beached off the shoal of Ayungin (also known as the Second Thomas Shoal) in 1999. It has since been occupied by a dozen Filipino Marines, all of whom take turns for an assignment of 5 months in order to assert the rights of sovereignty and jurisdiction of the Philippines on the island against the Chinese demands. The history of the building and its occupants was put on the spotlight on March 29, 2014, when journalists were able to take pictures of the Chinese Coast Guard attempting to block a Philippine civilian ship bringing supplies to the Sierra Madre Marines.

Ranks

Officers

Enlisted

Note: senior NCOs in command positions in the PMC have their rockers curved rather than straight in all orders of dress, staff NCOs keep the straight rockers.

Equipment

The Philippine Marine Corps has made use of its existing equipment to conduct its operations while modernization projects are underway. The Republic Act No. 7898 declares the policy of the State to modernize the military to a level where it can effectively and fully perform its constitutional mandate to uphold the sovereignty and preserve the patrimony of the republic. The law, as amended, has set conditions that should be satisfied when the defense department procures major equipment and weapon systems for the marine corps.

These are acquisition projects of the government that have been signed and awaiting delivery for the modernization of the air force.
 The Philippine Navy intends to acquire 60 new Tactical Combat Vehicles for the PMC, as part of the Horizon 2 phase of the Revised AFP Modernization Program.
 12 V-300 and 15 V-150 wheeled armored vehicles will have their turrets upgraded, and 7 V-150s will also undergo mobility upgrades as part of the Horizon 2 phase of the Revised AFP Modernization Program. Indian company Larsen & Toubro was contracted to conduct the said upgrade works.
 The Philippine Navy has ordered 702 units of ATGL-L rocket propelled grenade launchers and munitions from Bulgaria's Arsenal JSCo. for the PMC. These would replace the ageing 90mm recoilless rifles, which would in turn be mounted on light vehicles. The typical Marine squad table of organization will also be revised to include the ATGL-L RPG as part of its squad weapon. The weapons and munitions were delivered on 14 April 2021, and will be tested, while Marine units will undergo training with the new weapon.
 7,491 new body armor and 9,528 new combat helmets were ordered from Israel's Maron Dolphin in August 2020.
 The PMC is procuring new 60mm, 81mm, and 120mm Mortars. 30 units M-98 81mm mortars expected to be delivered from Spain's EXPAL Systems SA, while procurement process is still ongoing for the acquisition of 60mm and 120mm mortars.
 The Philippine Navy announced its intention to acquire two or three batteries of shore-based anti-ship missile system, most likely the Indian-made PJ-10 BrahMos Coastal Defense Battery System, to be operated by the PMC.
 The Philippine Navy plans to acquire two or three batteries of shore-based air defense missile systems, to be operated by the PMC to defend naval and marine installations, and the anti-ship missile batteries.

See also
 Philippine Army
 Philippine Navy
 Philippine Air Force
 Philippine Coast Guard

References

Works consulted

Bibliography
Gallant Warriors From The Sea: The Philippine Marines Today, March 8, 1998 by Franz Tinio Lopez , .

External links

Official Website of Philippine Marine Corps (archived)

 
Marines
Military units and formations established in 1950
1950 establishments in the Philippines